The Tsagaan Suvarga mine (white stupa) is a copper ore deposit and mine in development located in the Mandakh sum of Dornogovi aimag in the south of Mongolia.

The deposit is estimated at reserves of 240.1 million tonnes of ore grading 0.53% copper.
It is included in the Mongolian governments list of strategic important deposits.

References 

Copper mines in Mongolia